Malcolm Neil Christie (born 11 April 1979) is an English former professional footballer who played as a striker.

Initially playing at non-league level for Deeping Rangers and Nuneaton Borough, he went on to play in the Premier League for both Derby County and  Middlesbrough whilst also earning 11 caps for England U21. His career abruptly came to and end in 2009 whilst with Leeds United following a spinal injury.

Career

Early career
Born in Stamford, Lincolnshire, Christie first played football as a youth in the Peterborough area, and started his career at Northborough, moving onto non-League clubs Deeping Rangers and Nuneaton Borough. Whilst playing in non-League football he was also a supermarket shelf stacker.

Derby County
Christie's big break came in October 1998 when he was purchased by Derby County manager Jim Smith. His first start for the club came on 15 January 2000, and marked the occasion with two goals in a 4–1 win against Middlesbrough. On 5 May 2001, he scored the winning goal at Old Trafford as Derby beat Manchester United 1–0 to secure survival for the club. He spent one more season with Derby after they were relegated from the FA Premier League.

Middlesbrough
Middlesbrough signed Christie and Chris Riggott for a combined £3 million (possibly rising to £5m) in February 2003. Christie was part of Middlesbrough's 2004 League Cup-winning team. Despite being injured for the final, he appeared in the earlier rounds and scored the winner against Brighton & Hove Albion. His chances were limited at his new club due to several long-term injuries. In 2006, although unable to play due to injury, Christie was invited back to Nuneaton Borough as guest of honour for their FA Cup third round tie against Middlesbrough. Nuneaton went on to shock their visitors by producing a 1–1 draw, and earning a replay at the Riverside Stadium.

On 25 November 2006, after returning from his injuries, manager Gareth Southgate gave Christie a start against Aston Villa at Villa Park. Christie scored on his return in the 43rd minute in a match which finished 1–1. He was released by Middlesbrough when his contract expired in June 2007. He started a trial period with Hull City on 11 September 2007. However, he was not offered a contract at the end of his two-month trial. In January, Burton Albion offered to sign him, but he rejected the move.

Leeds United
In January 2008, he began a trial with Leeds United, but picked up an injury which scuppered any deal. In September, he began using the training facilities at Leeds United in a bid to gain full fitness with the blessing of Leeds' manager Gary McAllister; although, at the time, the offer was considered to be a courtesy, and not intended to be a trial
On 13 October 2008, however, he was cleared to play in a reserves fixture for Leeds against Scunthorpe United. On 10 November 2008, McAllister began to open up contract talks with Christie after regaining his fitness. He made his Leeds debut on 17 November 2008 against Northampton Town in the first round of the FA Cup. Christie scored his first goal for Leeds on 28 December, in the 3–1 victory away from home, against Stockport County.

Personal life
Christie suffered a spinal injury in training and, following medical advice, retired from professional football on 29 January 2009. Following his retirement, Christie took up a new career working as a salesman for Jaguar.

References

External links

1979 births
Living people
People from Stamford, Lincolnshire
Footballers from Lincolnshire
English footballers
England under-21 international footballers
Association football forwards
Deeping Rangers F.C. players
Nuneaton Borough F.C. players
Derby County F.C. players
Middlesbrough F.C. players
Leeds United F.C. players
Premier League players
English Football League players